Class 84 may refer to:

British Rail Class 84 – a class of electric locomotives
DRG Class 84 – a class of German 2-10-2T steam locomotives